Edison Township may refer to the following townships in the United States:

 Edison Township, Swift County, Minnesota
 Edison Township, New Jersey, in Middlesex County